Larry Haskell Friend (April 14, 1935 – February 27, 1998) was an American National Basketball Association (NBA) player.

Biography
Friend was born and raised in Chicago, Illinois, and was Jewish.  He played basketball at Marshall High School in Chicago. However, he moved to Los Angeles, California, before his senior year and played basketball at Fairfax High School.

Friend first played college basketball at Los Angeles City College, where he was named an All-American Junior College. He then transferred to the University of California, where he was a three-year starter. He averaged 19.1 points per game his senior season and was also named to the AP All-American third team.

Friend was drafted with the fifth pick in the second round of the 1957 NBA Draft by the New York Knicks. In his one season with the Knicks, Friend averaged 4.0 points, 2.4 rebounds, and 1.1 assists per game. In 1961–62 Friend returned to professional basketball to play for the Los Angeles Jets in the American Basketball League. He appeared in thirty-nine games for the Jets and averaged 11.0 points and 3.7 rebounds per game, while also leading the league in three-point shooting (58–163). Due to financial problems, the Jets folded midway through their first season. Following his playing career, Friend owned an investment business. In 1990 he was inducted into the Southern California Jewish Sports Hall of Fame.

He died on February 27, 1998, in Newport, California, of prostate cancer.
He is survived by four children, Denise, Russell, Matthew, and Nicholas.

References

1935 births
1998 deaths
All-American college men's basketball players
American Basketball League (1961–62) players
American men's basketball players
Basketball players from Chicago
California Golden Bears men's basketball players
Deaths from cancer in California
Forwards (basketball)
Guards (basketball)
Jewish men's basketball players
Jewish American sportspeople
Los Angeles City Cubs men's basketball players
New York Knicks draft picks
New York Knicks players
20th-century American Jews